Trevor Evans FRS (26 April 1927 — 10 October 2010) was a British physical scientist who specialised in the properties of diamonds.

Life 
Evans grew up in Wales. Following national service in the RAF, he moved to the University of Bristol to study physics. He later took up a research fellowship at the University of Reading, where he would become head of the physics department and where his research career would be based. His work was supported by De Beers, a firm for which Evans acted as a consultant.

He was elected fellow of the Institute of Physics in 1962, and fellow of the Royal Society in 1988.

References

Fellows of the Royal Society
1927 births
2010 deaths
Fellows of the Institute of Physics
Place of birth missing
Place of death missing
20th-century Welsh scientists
Alumni of the University of Bristol
Academics of the University of Reading
20th-century British physicists